The Gravity Tour is the eleventh concert tour by Irish boy band, Westlife. The tour supported their eleventh studio album, Gravity. The tour visits Europe, Asia and Africa. The tour was listed 55th in 2011 Worldwide First Quarter ticket sales list with 56,793 tickets sold at that time of the year only.

Background

The tour was announced a mere two weeks after the group completed their Where We Are Tour. The tour is directed by William Baker, who is known for his work with Kylie Minogue, Leona Lewis and Björk, will serve as creative director. With a new touring band and musical director, the group stated this tour will be "bigger and better" than their previous feats. The group hinted the tour having a space theme (to tie in with the title) and possibly feature a medley of hits by Barbadian recording artist, Rihanna. The tour became of major success in its infancy, with many ticket vendors' website crashing moments after tickets went on sale.

Originally, tour dates were announced only for the United Kingdom, but dates have since been added for Ireland, the Arabian Peninsula, and festival shows in Europe. Prominent car dealer Volkswagen supported this tour. Tour manager, Steve Martin explained, "With such a demanding tour schedule for the band over the next few weeks, we really wanted something that offered comfort but that was understated and reliable. The Phaeton and Caravelle blend all of this together to fit the bill perfectly and are the ideal support act for the tour".

During the concert at the Echo Arena Liverpool in Liverpool, England, the show was briefly paused as a set malfunction left the group hanging from the arena's ceiling by a swaying bar. A team of security guards helped lower the group, resuming the concert.

Opening acts
Wonderland (Europe—Leg 1)
Glenn Cal (Europe—Leg 1)
Young JV (Philippines)

Set list

The following setlist was obtained from the concert held on 18 March 2011, at the Echo Arena in Liverpool, England. It does not represent all concerts for the duration of the tour.
"No One's Gonna Sleep Tonight"
"When You're Looking Like That"
"World of Our Own"
"What Makes a Man"
"Safe"
"Home"
"Beautiful Tonight"
"Medley:"
"Viva la Vida"
"Only Girl (In the World)" 
"The Time (Dirty Bit)"
"Bad Romance"
"I Predict a Riot"
"Seasons in the Sun"
"You Raise Me Up"
"I'm Already There"
"I Will Reach You"
"Flying Without Wings"
"What About Now"
"Uptown Girl"

Tour dates

Festivals and other miscellaneous performances
This concert was a part of the Hampton Court Palace Festival
This concert was a part of Live at the Marquee
These concerts were a part of Forestry Commission—Live Music
This concert was a part of the "BBC Proms in the Park"
This concert was a part of the "FNB Festival"

Cancellations and rescheduled shows

Box office score data

Personnel

Vocals 

 Shane Filan
 Mark Feehily
 Kian Egan
 Nicky Byrne

Band 

Simon Ellis - Keyboards / Musical Director

Crew 

Simon Ellis - Musical Director

External links 

Westlife's Official Website

References

Westlife concert tours
2011 concert tours